"Mach 5" is a song by the American alternative rock band The Presidents of the United States of America. It was released in 1996 as a single from their album II. The single reached #29 on the charts in the UK.

The song's lyrics describe the experience of a child playing violently with firecrackers and Matchbox cars while pretending to be the hero of the cartoon Speed Racer. The single's cover shows children on tricycles wearing helmets and goggles like the cartoon character.

Track listing

Initial pressing
 "Mach 5" - 3:15
 "Tremelo Blooz" - 2:50
 "Tiki Lounge God" - 3:10
 "Carolyn's Bootie" (live) - 3:35

Australian version
 "Mach 5" - 3:15
 "Tremelo Blooz" - 2:50
 "Body" (live) - 4:11
 "Carolyn's Bootie" (live) - 3:35

Chart positions

References

1996 singles
The Presidents of the United States of America (band) songs
Music videos directed by Roman Coppola
1996 songs
Songs written by Chris Ballew